The 2003 Bingöl earthquake hit eastern Turkey with a moment magnitude of 6.4 and a maximum Mercalli intensity of IX (Violent) on 1 May at . The epicenter of this strike-slip earthquake was in Bingöl Province, 15 km north of Bingöl. At least 177 people were killed, and 625 buildings collapsed or suffered heavy damage in the affected region. Eighty-four of the fatalities occurred when a dormitory block collapsed in a boarding school in Celtiksuyu.

Tectonic setting
Most of Turkey lies on the Anatolian Plate, which is being forced westwards by the collision between the Arabian Plate and the Eurasian Plate. This westward movement is accommodated by two large strike-slip fault zones, the west–east trending right lateral North Anatolian Fault in the north of the country and the SW-NE trending left lateral East Anatolian Fault towards the south-east. Movement on these two faults have been responsible for many large and damaging earthquakes historically.

Earthquake
The earthquake occurred on May 1, 2003, with a depth of 15 km (9.3 mi). It was a strike-slip event, lasting about 17 seconds with a magnitude of 6.4. It occurred at 3:27 am local time. The strike-slip fault responsible was not the East Anatolian Fault; it ruptured a right-lateral strike-slip fault perpendicular to the East Anatolian Fault.

Damage

The earthquake damaged hundreds of buildings made of reinforced concrete and masonry. Many school buildings constructed within the last six years were heavily damaged. A total of 177 people were killed. 84 of the fatalities occurred when a dormitory block collapsed in a boarding school. A total 8,417 houses being damaged, of which 305 collapsed, 3,000 heavily damaged, 2,566 moderately damaged, and 2,546 slightly damaged. More than 90% of the schools in Bingöl were impacted, 
four schools collapsed, and 11 were lightly damaged. The school where the dormitory block collapsed was a 5-story building, which itself collapsed within seconds. Three hospitals in Bingöl were damaged.

See also
List of earthquakes in 2003
List of earthquakes in Turkey

References

Further reading

External links

2003 disasters in Turkey
2003 Bingöl
2003 earthquakes
2003 in Turkey
History of Bingöl Province
May 2003 events in Turkey